The Split Squad is a Rock and Roll band composed of Clem Burke (drums), Michael Giblin (bass/vocals), Josh Kantor (keyboards), Eddie Munoz (guitar/backing vocals), and Keith Streng (guitar/vocals).  Each member came to the public's attention as a member of another band, e.g., Burke is in Blondie, Giblin founded the Parallax Project, Kantor is in The Baseball Project, Munoz is in The Plimsouls, and Streng is in The Fleshtones.  Since many of the members of the band follow baseball, this led Annie Laurent Streng, Keith Streng's former wife, to propose the band's name.  The term refers to the practice, during Major League Baseball's Spring training, of teams often playing "split-squad games".  This occurs when a team splits into two sub-teams, or squads, and each squad plays a game against another team on the same day.  In addition to touring on both coasts, Canada, and Europe, the band's debut album, Now Hear This... was available for sale at shows in late 2013, and officially released through the usual online vendors in CD format on January 21, 2014.  The album was released on vinyl in time for Record Store Day - April 19, 2014.

Formation 

The formation of The Split Squad can be attributed to the friendship Parallax Project bandleader Giblin had with Munoz of The Plimsouls, and Giblin's inclination to work collaboratively with other musicians. Giblin and Munoz had worked together off and on through the 1990s, and rekindled their friendship in the mid-2000s during a SXSW Festival.  This led to Giblin organizing an East Coast tour for The Plimsouls in 2006. A few years later, Giblin organized several shows where Parallax Project shared the bill with Magic Christian and The Fleshtones.  This brought Giblin into close contact with Burke and Streng.  Over the course of that tour, Streng and Giblin started talking about forming a new band. Munoz enthusiastically endorsed the formation, and joined as the second guitarist.  Burke liked everyone involved and agreed to join.  Around the same time, Giblin had become friends with Josh Kantor, keyboardist in Jim's Big Ego, a band
he'd arranged to have perform in Harrisburg, PA.  Later, Parallax Project shared the bill with The Baseball Project, which Kantor also was in, so when the band was recording the album in David Minehan's Woolly Mammoth studio in Boston, they contacted Kantor, who added keyboards to some of the tracks.  Kantor tours with the rest of the band when show dates don't interfere with his job as the Fenway Park organist for the Boston Red Sox. The Split Squad made their live debut on March 16 at the 2013 SXSW Festival.

Another way to consider how the members came to know one another is to look at the relevant bands they've been in over the years:

Clem Burke->Blondie->Eurythmics->Chequered Past->The Romantics->The Plimsouls->Magic Christian->Empty Hearts
Michael Giblin->The Plimsouls (organized East Coast tour)->Jim's Big Ego (invited them to perform in his hometown)->Magic Christian (tour manager)->The Baseball Project (with Parallax Project)
Josh Kantor->Jim's Big Ego->The Baseball Project
Eddie Munoz->The Plimsouls->Action Dogs->The Fontanelles->The Phantom Chords(with Dave Vanian)->Magic Christian->Parallax Project
Keith Streng->The Fleshtones->Action Dogs->Full Time Men->Love Delegation->The Master Plan

A number of notable underground rock personalities have sat in with them at various gigs across the United States, including Peter Zaremba, Chuck Prophet, Steve Wynn, Peter Buck, Jason Victor, Amy Gore, Nikki Corvette, Andy Babiuk, and Brian Hurd (aka Daddy Long Legs).

Tours 

The Split Squad has performed at both the 2013 and 2014 South By Southwest music festivals. From Nov. 9 - Nov. 15, 2013 the band launched the "West Of Wherever Tour 2013" with The Fleshtones, touring cities in California, Seattle WA, Vancouver BC Canada, ending with a Big Bang-Up in Portland OR. From early March through late April 2014, the band played venues on the East Coast, with appearances at SXSW sandwiched between.  This tour included a live performance on the Evan "Funk" Davies show in the studios of WFMU.  Their 13 date "Summer 2014 Tour", from July 3 - August 3, 2014, starting in the Midwest, then touring up the East Coast, the Mid-Atlantic, and Toronto and Hamilton,ON Canada. The early (July 3–6) Split Squad shows on this tour had Florent Barbier on drums, as Burke was on tour with Blondie.  Linda Pitmon, like Barbier, also fills in on drums when Burke is unavailable.  The band had a short tour of the Northeast in the Spring of 2015 and has begun touring again in the Winter of 2016, as discussed below. Reviews of their shows have been uniformly positive.

Activities 

In August 2014, the group returned to Boston and the Woolly Mammoth Studio to record an original Christmas song, "Another Lonely Christmas”, that was released in the Fall of 2014 as part of a compilation album, "A Kool Kat Kristmas Volume 2".  Proceeds benefited the Susan Giblin Foundation for Animal Wellness and Welfare.  On 3 December 2015, the band website announced that their debut record was now being distributed by the French independent label Closer Records.  During the 13 February 2016 concert at The Windup Space in Baltimore, MD, bandleader Michael Giblin announced that an EP of new material would be released in 2016.  Two songs on the EP will be "Stop Me (If You've Heard This One Before", penned by Giblin, debuted the night before at the Harrisburg Midtown Arts Center, Harrisburg, PA, and the Keith Streng-penned "Showstopper". For the two concert series with the Paul Collins Beat, drummer Florent Barbier filled in for Clem Burke, who was in studio, recording the next Blondie album.  A 3 date tour in late March 2016 was with The Fleshtones.  During summer 2019, they toured with Southern Culture on the Skids.

Discography

Albums 

Now Hear This...  (2014) RCO1311 (vinyl) RCO1321 (CD) Closer Records CL135
Another Cinderella (2021) FOLC 168

Album compilations 

"Teenarama" on Starry Eyed ~ The Records Tribute Zero Hour Records (released June 9, 2013)
"Another Lonely Christmas" on A Kool Kat Kristmas Volume 2 PURR2050 Kool Kat Musik (released November 3, 2014)

Members 

Clem Burke - drums
Michael Giblin - lead vocals & bass guitar
Josh Kantor - keyboards
Eddie Munoz - backing vocals & guitar
Keith Streng - Vocals & guitar

Bullpen

Florent Barbier - drums
Scott McCaughey - vocals & guitar
Linda Pitmon - drums

References

American new wave musical groups
American power pop groups
Musical groups established in 2012
2012 establishments in New York City